Purple Death from Outer Space is a 1966 American black-and-white science fiction film directed by Ford Beebe and Ray Taylor. It is the first of two feature-length compilations of the 1940 serial Flash Gordon Conquers the Universe. The second, Perils from the Planet Mongo, was released the same year.

Plot 
When the Earth is attacked by a mysterious substance causing death and leaving the victim purple, Dr Zarkov, Flash Gordon, and Dale Arden discover the deaths are caused by one of Ming's spaceships from the planet Mongo. The trio go to the planet to bring an antidote back to the Earth and thwart Ming's schemes. Ming's plan is to steal all the Earth's nitrogen.

Along the way, Flash and his cohorts meet Azura Queen of Magic who plans to turn all humans into Clay People, White Sapphire, the Tree People, the White Sapphire and Prince Barin.

Reception
Creature Feature found the film to be a rousing video, giving it three out of five stars. The Encyclopedia of Science Fiction prefers the full, unedited version.

Cast 
Buster Crabbe as Flash Gordon
Carol Hughes as Dale Arden
Charles Middleton as Ming the Merciless
Frank Shannon as Dr. Zarkov
Don Rowan as Capt. Torch (archive footage)
Victor Zimmerman as Lt. Thong (archive footage)
Lee Powell as Capt. Roka (archive footage)
Donald Curtis as Capt. Ronal (archive footage)
Edgar Edwards as Capt. Turan (archive footage)
Roland Drew as Prince Barin
Shirley Deane as Princess Aura
Luli Deste as Queen Fria
Sigurd Nilssen as Count Korro (archive footage)
John Hamilton as Prof. Gordon (archive footage)
Herbert Rawlinson as Prof. Frohman (archive footage)
Tom Chatterton as Dr. Arden (archive footage)

Soundtrack 
Les préludes by Franz Liszt

See also
List of American films of 1966

References

External links

1966 films
1960s science fiction films
American black-and-white films
Flash Gordon films
Films directed by Ford Beebe
Films with screenplays by George H. Plympton
1960s English-language films
1960s American films